Maasen is a municipality in the district of Diepholz, in Lower Saxony, Germany.

References

Diepholz (district)